Maserati has made three inline-4 racing engines, that were designed for both Formula One and Sports car racing. Their second engine was the naturally-aspirated 250S engine; with the 2.5 L engine configuration, and was used by Cooper and JBW. Their third and final engine was the naturally-aspirated Tipo 6-1500; with the 1.5 L engine configuration, and the customer engine was used by Cooper, Emeryson, Lotus, and E.N.B. teams.

A  version of the engine was used in the Maserati 150S, (as well as the Maserati 150 GT concept car) and a  version of this engine was also used in the 1955-1959 Maserati 200S sports car.

Reference 

Maserati
Formula One engines
Gasoline engines by model
Straight-four engines